Robert Grey Bushong (June 10, 1883 – April 6, 1951) was a Republican member of the U.S. House of Representatives from Pennsylvania.

Robert G. Bushong was born in Reading, Pennsylvania. He was the son of Jacob and Lillie (Roberts) Bushong and the grandson of Anthony Ellmaker Roberts. He attended Phillips Academy in Andover, Massachusetts. He graduated from Yale University in 1903 and from the law school of Columbia University, New York City, in 1906. He was admitted to the bar in 1906 and commenced practice in Reading. He served as a member of the Pennsylvania State House of Representatives in 1908 and 1909. He was the president judge of the orphans' court of Berks County, Pennsylvania, in 1914 and 1915. He was a delegate to the Republican National Conventions in 1916 and 1924.

Bushong was elected as a Republican to the Seventieth Congress, and was not a candidate for renomination in 1928.  He resumed the practice of law in Reading and resided in Sinking Spring, Pennsylvania.  He died in Reading.  Interment in Reading's Charles Evans Cemetery.

Sources

The Political Graveyard
"Robert G. Bushong." New York Times. 7 Apr 1951, 12.

1883 births
1951 deaths
Burials at Charles Evans Cemetery
Politicians from Reading, Pennsylvania
Republican Party members of the Pennsylvania House of Representatives
Pennsylvania lawyers
Phillips Academy alumni
Yale University alumni
Columbia Law School alumni
Republican Party members of the United States House of Representatives from Pennsylvania
20th-century American politicians
20th-century American lawyers